The 2014–15 South Florida Bulls women's basketball team represented the University of South Florida in the 2014–15 NCAA Division I basketball season. The Bulls, coached by Jose Fernandez in his fifteenth season, played their home games at the USF Sun Dome in Tampa, Florida. This was USF's second season as a member of the American Athletic Conference, known as The American or AAC. The Bulls were picked in the preseason to place second in the AAC. They finished second in the conference and advanced all the way to the final of the 2015 American Athletic Conference women's basketball tournament, however, they fell 84–70 to UConn. South Florida fell to 0–17 all-time to the Huskies. They finished the season 27–8, 15–3 in AAC play to finish in second place. They received at-large bid to the NCAA women's tournament, where they defeated LSU in the first round before losing to Louisville in the second round.

Media
All Bulls games will air on Bullscast Radio or CBS 1010 AM. Conference home games will rotate between ESPN3, AAC Digital, and Bullscast. Road games will typically be streamed on the opponents website, though conference road games could also appear on ESPN3 or AAC Digital.

Roster

Schedule

|-
!colspan=9 style="background:#006747; color:#CFC493;"|Non-conference regular season

|-
!colspan=9 style="background:#006747; color:#CFC493;"|AAC regular season

|-
!colspan=12 style="background:#006747;"|2015 AAC Tournament

|-
!colspan=12 style="background:#006747;"|NCAA Women's tournament

Rankings

See also
 2014–15 South Florida Bulls men's basketball team

Sources

South Florida Bulls women's basketball seasons
South Florida
South Florida Bulls women's basketball
South Florida Bulls women's basketball
South